Andrii Borysovych Yermak (born 21 November 1971) is a Ukrainian film producer, lawyer and the Head of the Office of the President of Ukraine. Ukrainian President Volodymyr Zelenskyy appointed him on 11 February 2020. He is also a member of the National Security and Defense Council of Ukraine, as well as the Chairman of the Coordination Headquarters for Humanitarian and Social Affairs.

Biography
Andrii Yermak was born on 21 November 1971 in Kyiv, Ukraine (then part of the Soviet Union). Yermak's Russian-born mother Maria met his Kyiv native father Borys on a school trip of a Leningrad school to Kyiv. Yermak's father is Jewish. They met through mutual acquaintances. The couple married in 1971 and she moved to Kyiv. Yermak has a brother Denys, who is 8 years younger.

In 1990, he started and in 1995 Yermak graduated from Kyiv's Taras Shevchenko National University's Institute of International Relations with a master's degree in international private law. The same year he received his license for law practice. In his second year of university, at the request of one of his teachers, he started working for the law company Proxen.

In 1997, Yermak founded the International Law Firm and was engaged in the field of intellectual property and commercial law. Between 2006 and 2014 he, in his profession as lawyer, aided Party of Regions MP Elbrus Tedeyev.

In the 2010 Ukrainian presidential election, Yermak was a proxy of candidate Arseniy Yatsenyuk in Kyiv's 216th constituency.

Yermak became acquainted with Volodymyr Zelenskyy in 2011, when Zelenskyy was the general producer of the TV channel Inter. The two became friends. Yermak worked in Zelenskyy's election campaign team in the 2019 Ukrainian presidential election.

On 21 May 2019, newly elected President Zelenskyy appointed Yermak as Presidential Aide for Foreign Policy Issues. In this role he negotiated major prison exchanges with Russia during the War in Donbas. Yermak was the point of contact for Kurt Volker and Rudy Giuliani on behalf of Zelenskyy during the buildup of the Trump–Ukraine scandal.

President Zelenskyy appointed Yermak as Head of the Office of the President of Ukraine on 11 February 2020. Yermak became a member of the National Security and Defense Council the following day.

Yermak was appointed chairman of the Coordination Headquarters for Humanitarian and Social Affairs on March 2, 2022.

Personal life
Yermak has lived in Kyiv his whole life. He is single and has no children.

References

External links
 
 
 
 
 Feb 12, 2020 Radio Free Europe/Radio Liberty

1971 births
Living people
Politicians from Kyiv
Taras Shevchenko National University of Kyiv, Institute of International Relations alumni
Independent politicians in Ukraine
Head of the Presidential Administration of Ukraine
Jewish Ukrainian politicians
Ukrainian film producers
21st-century Ukrainian lawyers
21st-century Ukrainian politicians
National Security and Defense Council of Ukraine